Camillo Vescovo (born 1960) is an Italian ski mountaineer, who lives in the Valtellina region.

Selected results 
 1996:
 6th, Pierra Menta (together with Cheto Blavaschi)
 2000:
 7th (and 2nd in "seniors II" ranking), Patrouille des Glaciers ("seniors II" ranking), together with Ivan Murada and Graziano Boscacci
 2003:
 1st, Trofeo Kima
 3rd, European Championship team race (together with Mirco Mezzanotte)
 6th, European Championship combination ranking
 8th, European Championship single race
 4th, Trofeo Mezzalama (together Guido Giacomelli and Mirco Mezzanotte)

 2004:
 1st, Italian Cup

References 

1960 births
Living people
Italian male ski mountaineers